Wesley P. Andrus (February 19, 18341898) was a Michigan politician.

Early life
Andrus was born on February 19, 1834, in Potter, New York to parents Stephen P. and Lucina Andrus.

Military career
In 1861, Andrus joined the 42nd Illinois Infantry Regiment, where he was promoted to the rank of captain from the rank first lieutenant. Andrus was wounded at the battle of Missionary Ridge, and was discharged due to disability in May 1864.

Political career
On November 7, 1876, Andrus was elected to the Michigan Senate where he represented the 25th district from January 3, 1877, to 1878.

Personal life
Andrus was married to Alice T. Thomas. Together they had at least four children.

Death
Andrus died in 1898 in Cedar Springs, Michigan.

References

1834 births
1898 deaths
Union Army soldiers
Republican Party Michigan state senators
American politicians with disabilities
19th-century American politicians